October Days is a 1958 Soviet drama film directed by Sergei Vasilyev.

Plot 
The head of the Provisional Government, Kerensky in suspense: the soldiers do not want to fight, and the Bolsheviks are preparing the people for a revolution...

Cast 
 Vladimir Chestnokov as Lenin (as V. Chestnokov)
 V. Brener as Krupskaya
 Leonid Lyubashevsky as Sverdlov (as L. Lyubashevskiy)
 Adolf Shestakov as Dzerzhinsiky (as A. Shestakov)
 Andro Kobaladze as Stalin (as A. Kobaladze)
 David Volosov as Uritskiy (as D. Volosov)
 Nina Mamaeva as Margarita Fofanova (as N. Mamayeva)
 Konstantin Kalinis as Podvoyskiy (as K. Kalinis)
 Georgy Satini as Antonov- Ovseyenko (as G. Satini)
 German Khovanov as Yeremeyev (as G. Khovanov)

References

External links 
 
 October Days on Kinopoisk

1958 films
1950s Russian-language films
Soviet comedy films
1958 comedy films